Ventseslav Kuzmichev (Вентсеслав Кузьмичев) was a sailor from Russia, who represented his country at the 1912 Summer Olympics in Nynäshamn, Sweden in the 8 Metre.

References

External links
 

Russian male sailors (sport)
Olympic sailors of Russia
Sailors at the 1912 Summer Olympics – 8 Metre
Year of birth missing
Year of death missing